Eurukuttarus is a genus of moths belonging to the family Psychidae.

Species:

Eurukuttarus asiatica 
Eurukuttarus decemvena 
Eurukuttarus laniata 
Eurukuttarus melanostola 
Eurukuttarus nigra 
Eurukuttarus pileatus 
Eurukuttarus rotunda

References

Psychidae
Psychidae genera